Eudonia hawaiiensis is a moth of the family Crambidae. It is endemic to the Hawaiian islands of Oahu, Molokai, Maui and Hawaii.

External links

Eudonia
Endemic moths of Hawaii
Moths described in 1881